Pietro Paolo Naldini (1619–1691), also known as Paolo Naldini, was an Italian sculptor.

Naldini specialized in sculpting religious-themed works, primarily angels. He is known to have previously collaborated with Gian Lorenzo Bernini. He also sculpted the statue of the patron saint of San Filippo Benizi, Todi.

References

1619 births
1691 deaths
17th-century Italian sculptors
Italian male sculptors